John McKoon House, also known as Johnson House, was a historic home located at La Grange, Lewis County, Missouri. It was built about 1857, and was a two-story, five bay, brick I-house with Greek Revival style design elements.  It had a -story brick rear ell enlarged about 1876.  It featured an original two story portico with square wood columns and a simple wide cornice with delicately scaled dentil molding. It has been demolished.

It was listed on the National Register of Historic Places in 1999.

References

Houses on the National Register of Historic Places in Missouri
Greek Revival houses in Missouri
Houses completed in 1857
Buildings and structures in Lewis County, Missouri
National Register of Historic Places in Lewis County, Missouri